(English: "the newspaper of sacred teachings") is a Japanese newspaper. In 1997, it claimed a 5,5 million circulation, but the number is controversial and impossible to verify..It is owned by the Japanese Buddhist religious movement Soka Gakkai.

Background 
The Seikyo Shimbun was first published on 20 April 1951.

Unlike the other daily newspapers in Japan, the Seikyo Shinbun is not a member of the Japan Newspaper Publishers and Editors Association nor the  who are officially in charge of the circulation numbers of Japanese newspapers.

The publication is owned and operated by the Japanese Buddhist organization Soka Gakkai, and often features news articles about the activities of the president of the Soka Gakkai International (SGI), Daisaku Ikeda, and essays written by him, as well as news and experiences by Soka Gakkai members in Japan and abroad. The newspaper also features general news reports of domestic and international topics, and occasional articles related to Sōka University and Soka University of America.

The Seikyo Shimbun is delivered throughout Japan by volunteer deliverers to its subscribers. It is not sold in public shops.

History
 1951 April 20 - First issue of the Seikyo Shimbun is published. The paper has a two-page format and is published every 10 days with nominally a circulation of 5,000.
 1965 July 15 - The Seikyo Shimbun becomes a daily paper.
 1971 January 4 - Adopts a 12-page format (which remains the same as of 2016).
 1990 July 19 - 10,000th issue published.
 2006 November 18 - Official website of the Seikyo Shimbun, Seikyo Online is launched.

See also
Self-publishing

References

Further reading

External links
 Seikyo Online

1951 establishments in Japan
Publications established in 1951
Daily newspapers published in Japan
Japanese-language newspapers
Soka Gakkai